Chauncey Hugh Stigand  (1877–1919) was a British army officer, colonial administrator and big game hunter. He was killed in action while attempting to suppress a rebellion of Aliab Dinka.

Biography
Stigand was the son of William Stigand and Agnes Catherine Senior. His father was British vice-consul at Boulogne-sur-Mer when he was born there on 25 october 1877. He was educated at Radley and gazetted as a second lieutenant in the Royal West Kent Regiment on 4 January 1899. Serving with them in Burma and British Somaliland, he was promoted to lieutenant on 13 March 1901. He transferred to British East Africa and was seconded to serve with the King's African Rifles in December 1902.

He entered the Egyptian army in 1910 and was posted to the Upper White Nile, assuming control of the Lado Enclave from the Belgians in accordance with an agreement.
He was placed in charge of the Kajo Kaji district.

In 1915 Stigand was promoted to major. In 1916 he served in the campaign against 'Ali Dinar in Darfur. From 1917 to 1918 he was governor of the Upper Nile province.
Stigand was appointed governor of Mongalla Province in 1919. He was killed on 8 december 1919 by tribesmen of the Aliyab Dinka at Pap, between the Lau River and the White Nile.

He married in 1913 Nancy Yulee Neff of Washington, D.C., and had one child, Florida Yulee Agnes, born 1917.

Bibliography
Stigand was a prolific writer.

See also
 List of famous big game hunters

References

External links
 
 

1877 births
1919 deaths
British colonial governors and administrators in Africa
Officers of the Order of the British Empire
Fellows of the Royal Geographical Society
Fellows of the Zoological Society of London
Anglo-Egyptian Sudan people
Elephant hunters
Lado Enclave